The 2021–22 season was Győri Audi ETO KC's 42nd competitive and consecutive season in the Nemzeti Bajnokság I and 74th year in existence as a handball club.

Players

Squad information

Goalkeepers
1  Laura Glauser 
 12  Amandine Leynaud 
 16  Silje Solberg
Left wingers
 6  Nadine Schatzl 
 23  Csenge Fodor 
Right wingers
 22  Viktória Lukács
 48  Dorottya Faluvégi
Pivots
 5  Linn Blohm 
 7  Kari Brattset Dale 
 77  Crina Pintea

Left backs
4  Eszter Ogonovszky
8  Anne Mette Hansen (c)
 21  Veronica Kristiansen 
 45  Noémi Háfra 
 80  Jelena Despotović
Centre backs
 15  Stine Bredal Oftedal 
 27  Estelle Nze Minko
 81  Júlia Farkas
Right backs
 11  Ryu Eun-hee
 55  Laura Kürthi

Transfers

 IN
  Ambros Martín (Head coach)
  Nadine Schatzl (LW) (from  FTC-Rail Cargo Hungaria)
  Noémi Háfra (LB) (from  FTC-Rail Cargo Hungaria)
  Jelena Despotović (LB) (from  Debreceni VSC Hungaria) 
  Ryu Eun-hee (RB) (from  Busan Bisco)
  Linn Blohm (P) (from  CS Minaur Baia Mare)
  Crina Pintea (P) (from  CSM București) 
  Júlia Farkas (CB) (from own rows)
  Laura Kürthi (RB) (back from loan from  MTK Budapest) as of January 2022

 OUT
  Gábor Danyi (Head coach) (to  Siófok KC)
  Szidónia Puhalák  (LW) (to  Siófok KC)
  Brigitta Csekő (LW) (to  Mosonmagyaróvári KC SE)
  Amanda Kurtović (RB) (to  HC Dunărea Brăila)
  Eduarda Amorim Taleska (LB) (to  Rostov-Don)
  Béatrice Edwige (P) (to  Rostov-Don)  Laura Kürthi (RB) (on loan to  MTK Budapest)  Anita Görbicz (LW) (retires)''

Club

Technical Staff

Source: Coaches, Management

Uniform
Supplier:  Adidas
Main sponsor: Audi / tippmix / OTP Bank / City of Győr 
Back sponsor: PannErgy / Győrszol
Shorts sponsor: OMV / Leier / OIL!

Pre-season

Friendly matches

Competitions

Overview

Nemzeti Bajnokság I

League table

Results by round

Matches

Results overview

Hungarian Cup

Round 5

Semi-final

Final

EHF Champions League

Group stage

Matches

Results overview

Knockout stage

Quarter-finals

Semi-final

Final

Statistics

Top scorers
Includes all competitive matches. The list is sorted by shirt number when total goals are equal.

Attendances

List of the home matches:

Notes

References

External links
 
 Győri Audi ETO KC  at eurohandball.com

 
Győri ETO